Caught in the Net may refer to:
 Caught in the Net (1928 film)
 Caught in the Net (2020 film)